María Paula Salas Zúñiga (born 12 July 2002) is a Costa Rican footballer who plays as a forward for Mexican Liga MX Femenil club CF Monterrey and the Costa Rica women's national team.

International career
Salas appeared in two matches for Costa Rica at the 2018 CONCACAF Women's Championship.

References

2002 births
Living people
Costa Rican women's footballers
Women's association football forwards
C.F. Monterrey (women) players
Costa Rica women's international footballers
Footballers at the 2019 Pan American Games
Medalists at the 2019 Pan American Games
Pan American Games bronze medalists for Costa Rica
Pan American Games medalists in football
Costa Rican expatriate footballers
Costa Rican expatriate sportspeople in Mexico
Expatriate women's footballers in Mexico